St. Bride's or St. Bride's Wentloog is a small hamlet to the south west of the city of Newport in South Wales.

Location 
It lies in the parish of Wentlooge and electoral district (ward) of Marshfield. Like most of the settlements on the Wentloog Level it lies on land behind the sea wall, reclaimed from the Bristol Channel, and criss-crossed by large and small drainage ditches, known locally as reens.

History 
The village and church of St. Bride's, Wentloog is dedicated to St. Bridget.

St Brides church is an ancient building of stone in the Decorated and Perpendicular styles, and consists of chancel, nave, south porch and an unusually fine perpendicular embattled western tower containing 6 bells, four of which are dated 1734 and bear inscriptions. A plaque inside the porch marks the high-tide level of the Bristol Channel floods of 1607.

It was the birthplace of Lyn Harding (1867–1952), the actor of stage, silent and talkie films, and radio.

References

External links

At Kelly's Directory for Monmouthshire,1901

Districts of Newport, Wales
Villages in Newport, Wales
Churches in Newport, Wales